Cornelius Connie Colzie, better known as Neal Colzie, (February 28, 1953  – August 20, 2001) was an American football cornerback for the Oakland Raiders (1975–1978), Miami Dolphins (1979), and Tampa Bay Buccaneers (1980–1983). He also played for the Orlando Renegades of the USFL in 1985.

Early years 
Born on February 28, 1953, in Fitzgerald, Georgia, Colzie was one of six children of Thelma and Jim Colzie. His father was a Negro league baseball pitcher. After attending Coral Gables Senior High School in Coral Gables, Florida, he played for Ohio State University, where he recorded 15 interceptions and returned 60 punts for 855 yards and two touchdowns.  At the time, his 15 interceptions ranked him fourth in school history, and his 855 punt return yards were a school record.

Career 
During his nine-season career, Colzie recorded a total of 25 interceptions, which he returned for 412 yards and a touchdown. He also recovered five fumbles, returning them for 42 yards and a touchdown. His best season was in 1981, recording six interceptions for 110 yards and a touchdown, along with one fumble recovery. Colzie also returned seven kickoffs for 130 yards in his career.

Colzie excelled as a punt returner on special teams. In his first NFL season, he recorded 655 punt return yards, the most ever by an NFL rookie. Overall, Colzie returned 170 punts for 1,759 yards during his career. One of his more notable performances was in the Raiders' 32-14 win over the Minnesota Vikings in Super Bowl XI. Colzie recorded four punt returns for a Super Bowl record of 43 yards, including a 25-yard return that set up a Raiders touchdown, and a 12-yard return that set up a field goal. He was offered a role in the movie " Black Sunday " but turned it down, refusing to wear a Pittsburgh Steelers uniform for the role.

Colzie died on August 20, 2001, in Miami of a heart attack at the age of 48.

References

External links 
 Colzie's stats including his special teams return yards

American football cornerbacks
Ohio State Buckeyes football players
Oakland Raiders players
Miami Dolphins players
Tampa Bay Buccaneers players
Ohio State University alumni
1953 births
2001 deaths
Washington Federals/Orlando Renegades players
People from Fitzgerald, Georgia
Players of American football from Georgia (U.S. state)